Double Yoke is a 1982 novel written by Nigerian writer Buchi Emecheta. It was published in the US on September 2, 1982, by George Braziller.

Plot summary
The story emphasises the life of students and lecturers in most Nigerian universities. The novel is set in the University of Calabar. Ete Kamba, a young boy who is expected to become a man of substance, gets a scholarship to study at the University of Calabar, where he meets Nko at a party, a girl who had graduated from her hairdressing apprenticeship program. On their way back to Nko's hostel, Ete forces himself on Nko. However, she does not resist. Ete refuses to marry Nko, stating that he cannot marry someone who is not a virgin. Eventually, Nko reveals her predicament to Professor Ikot, who takes advantage of the situation: Nko must sleep with Professor Ikot in order to pass her exam. Nko refuses and beats him. She realises that she is now pregnant with Ete's child.

Reception
D. A. N. Jones wrote in the London Review of Books: "Buchi Emecheta’s novel is dedicated to her 1981 students at the University of Calabar. Double Yoke is a tale of student life at that university and evidently the teacher has learned a great deal from her pupils, pulling out passages from their essays and exercises to make her own point about their lives and ideas. ... Miss Emecheta is happy to halt her pacey narrative and tell the reader bluntly what she thinks of her characters and life in general. This technique, the sermon in parenthesis, is acceptable in skilful story-tellers, like Miss Emecheta." In 1985, the novel was considered as new and noteworthy by The New York Times.

References 

1982 Nigerian novels
English-language novels
Nigerian English-language novels
Novels by Buchi Emecheta